"A Rock 'n' Roll Fantasy" is the lead single and fourth track from The Kinks' 1978 album Misfits. Written by Ray Davies, the song was inspired by the band's then-tumultuous state at the time, with two members leaving the band during the recording of Misfits. Released as the first single from the album, the track was the band's most successful single in years, reaching number 30.

Background
During the recording of the Misfits album, bassist Andy Pyle and pianist John Gosling quit the band, with drummer Mick Avory also considering leaving. Following this change, Ray and Dave Davies got together and spent time with each other, a meeting that resulted in the writing of Ray's "A Rock 'n' Roll Fantasy" and Dave's "Trust Your Heart."

Ray Davies has since said, A Rock 'n' Roll Fantasy' a very personal song about Dave and I." He has also claimed that "A Rock 'n' Roll Fantasy" inspired by both a Peter Frampton concert he attended and the death of rock 'n' roll legend Elvis Presley in 1977. He said, "It's a Method acting songwriting job. I use personal things to get something else out of me... Elvis Presley died last week and it all just added up."

Lyrics

The lyrics of "A Rock 'n' Roll Fantasy" describe a man named Dan who is a huge fan of The Kinks. He engulfs himself in their music whenever he feels unhappy, "living in a rock 'n' roll fantasy". The song also details when Ray Davies and his brother Dave were thinking of breaking up The Kinks. This is evident in lyrics such as "break up the band, start a new life be a new man."

Release and reception

The track was the first from Misfits to be released as a single. It was backed with "Artificial Light" in Britain, and "Live Life" on the U.S. version. It peaked at number 30 on the Billboard Hot 100 in America, the band's best charting American single since 1970's "Lola." It also charted at number 30 in Canada.

The track is generally cited by critics as one of the highlights from Misfits. Stephen Thomas Erlewine of AllMusic called the track one of the two "touchstones" of the album and named it as a highlight from the album. Ken Emerson of Rolling Stone called the song "ruthless", and went on to say,

Cash Box said it has "an excellent melodic line, strong guitar work" and fine lead vocals."  Record World said "The production is sensational and Davies' vocals perfectly suit the somewhat jaded message in the lyrics."

The song has since appeared on the compilation album Come Dancing with The Kinks.

References

1978 songs
The Kinks songs
Songs written by Ray Davies
Arista Records singles
1978 singles